Lára Kristín Pedersen (born 23 May 1994) is an Icelandic footballer who plays as a midfielder for Besta-deild kvenna club Valur and the Iceland women's national team.

Club career
Pedersen is from Mosfellsbær and began her football career with Afturelding. She spent five largely successful seasons with Stjarnan from 2014 to 2018, but refused a new contract and decided to move on after the club finished third in 2018. After spending a season with Þór/KA she signed a two-year contract with KR in October 2019.

In February 2021 Pedersen signed for Napoli, as a replacement for Jacynta Galabadaarachchi who had transferred to Celtic.

International career
Pedersen won her first senior cap for the Iceland women's national football team on 4 March 2015, in a 2–0 defeat by Switzerland at the 2015 Algarve Cup. She was named as one of eight players on standby for the Iceland squad at UEFA Women's Euro 2017.

Personal life
In February 2019 Pedersen gave a radio interview which revealed her long-term struggle with a food addiction.

References

External links

1994 births
Living people
Icelandic women's footballers
Women's association football defenders
Úrvalsdeild kvenna (football) players
Afturelding women's football players
Þór/KA players
KR women's football players
Stjarnan women's football players
Iceland women's international footballers
Expatriate women's footballers in Italy
Icelandic expatriate footballers
Icelandic expatriate sportspeople in Italy
Serie A (women's football) players
S.S.D. Napoli Femminile players
St. John's Red Storm women's soccer players